The Caribbean Airline Pilots Association is a trade union federation that represents airline pilots organisations in the Caribbean region.

Founded in 1997, with the support and assistance of the International Federation of Air Line Pilots' Associations (IFALPA), the organisation was a response to the recognition that the airline industry was rapidly evolving towards airline globalisation and an indication of this was the proposal that one regional airline be created. Although this has not yet happened, airlines within the region have gone through a series of financial crises which confirm the original perspectives that led to the formation of Caribbean ALPA.

Member Organisations
 Bahamas Airline Pilots Association
 Cayman Airline Pilots Association
 Jamaica Airline Pilots Association
 Leeward Islands Airline Pilots Association
 Trinidad and Tobago Airline Pilots Association
 VNV-NA (Netherlands Antilles)
 Suriname Pilots Association (Suriname)
 VVA (Aruba).

See also

 List of trade unions

External links
 International Federation of Air Line Pilots' Associations

Trade unions in the Caribbean
Aviation in the Caribbean
Airline pilots' trade unions
International Federation of Air Line Pilots' Associations
Trade unions established in 1997